Richmond County is a county located in the U.S. state of Georgia. As of the 2020 census, the population was 206,607. It is one of the original counties of Georgia, created February 5, 1777. Following an election in 1995, the city of Augusta (the county seat) consolidated governments with Richmond County. The consolidated entity is known as Augusta-Richmond County, or simply Augusta. Exempt are the cities of Hephzibah and Blythe, in southern Richmond County, which voted to remain separate. Richmond County is included in the Augusta-Richmond County, GA-SC Metropolitan Statistical Area.

History
The county is named for Charles Lennox, 3rd Duke of Richmond, a British politician and office-holder sympathetic to the cause of the American colonies. Richmond was also a first cousin to King George III.

Richmond County was established in 1777 by the first Constitution of the (newly independent) State of Georgia. As such, it is one of the original counties of the state. It was formed out of a portion of the colonial Parish of St. Paul, after the Revolution disestablished the Church of England in the (former) Royal Province of Georgia.

Geography

The vast majority of Richmond County is located in the Middle Savannah River sub-basin of the Savannah River basin, with just the southwestern corner of the county, from a line running north from Blythe through the middle of Fort Gordon, located in the Brier Creek sub-basin of the Savannah River basin.

Adjacent counties
 Edgefield County, South Carolina (north)
 Aiken County, South Carolina (northeast)
 Burke County (south)
 Jefferson County (southwest)
 McDuffie County (west)
 Columbia County (northwest)

Transportation

Major highways

  Interstate 20
  Interstate 520
  U.S. Route 1
  U.S. Route 25
  U.S. Route 25 Business
  U.S. Route 78
  U.S. Route 278
  State Route 4
  State Route 10
  State Route 28
  State Route 56
  State Route 88
  State Route 104
  State Route 104 Connector
  State Route 121
  State Route 223
  State Route 232
  State Route 383
  State Route 402 (unsigned designation for I-20)
  State Route 415 (unsigned designation for I-520)
  State Route 540 (Fall Line Freeway)
   State Route 555 & 565 (Savannah River Parkway)

Pedestrians and cycling

 Augusta Canal Historic Trail
 New Bartram Trail
 Phinizy Swamp Constructed Wetlands Trail
 River Levee Trail
 Riverwalk Augusta Trail

Demographics

2020 census

As of the 2020 United States census, there were 206,607 people, 68,361 households, and 42,363 families residing in the county.

2010 census
As of the 2010 United States Census, there were 200,549 people, 76,924 households, and 48,641 families residing in the county. The racial makeup of the county was 54.2% black or African American, 39.7% white, 1.7% Asian, 0.3% American Indian, 0.2% Pacific islander, 1.3% from other races, and 2.6% from two or more races. Those of Hispanic or Latino origin made up 4.1% of the population. In terms of ancestry, 8.0% were American, 7.0% were Irish, 6.7% were German, and 5.3% were English.

Of the 76,924 households, 33.6% had children under the age of 18 living with them, 35.6% were married couples living together, 22.6% had a female householder with no husband present, 36.8% were non-families, and 30.4% of all households were made up of individuals. The average household size was 2.47 and the average family size was 3.09. The median age was 33.2 years.

The median income for a household in the county was $37,882 and the median income for a family was $45,220. Males had a median income of $37,368 versus $29,313 for females. The per capita income for the county was $20,604. About 19.4% of families and 23.3% of the population were below the poverty line, including 36.5% of those under age 18 and 12.1% of those age 65 or over.

Communities
 Augusta (county seat)
 Blythe
 Hephzibah
 Fort Gordon

Notable person
 David E. Twiggs

Politics
Similar to most urban counties in the state with majority African American populations, Richmond County has backed the Democratic Party candidate by increasing margins since 1992. However in every presidential election from 1952 to 1988 which did not have Georgian Jimmy Carter on the ballot, the county backed the Republican candidate for president. Prior to 1952, the county voted like a typical Solid South county, voting for Democratic presidential candidates by landslide margins until backing Dixiecrat Strom Thurmond in 1948. 1928 was an exception to this rule with Herbert Hoover beating Al Smith handily due to anti-Catholic sentiment.

See also

 National Register of Historic Places listings in Richmond County, Georgia
 Richmond County School System
 New Savannah, Georgia
List of counties in Georgia

References

Further reading
 A. Ray Rowland (ed.), Historical Markers of Richmond County, Georgia. Augusta, GA: Richmond County Historical Society, 1966.
 Richmond County History. Augusta, GA: Richmond County Historical Society, 1969-date. —Journal, established Winter 1969.

External links
 Official website of Augusta-Richmond County consolidated government
 Documents from Richmond County in the Digital Library of Georgia
 Georgia Department of Transportation map of Richmond County (Note: map uses pre-consolidation city boundaries)

 
Georgia (U.S. state) counties
1777 establishments in Georgia (U.S. state)
Populated places established in 1777
Augusta metropolitan area
Black Belt (U.S. region)
Majority-minority counties in Georgia